Ellsworth Township may refer to the following places in the United States:

 Ellsworth Township, Logan County, Arkansas
 Ellsworth Township, Emmet County, Iowa
 Ellsworth Township, Hamilton County, Iowa, Hamilton County
 Ellsworth Township, Ellsworth County, Kansas
 Ellsworth Township, Michigan
 Ellsworth Township, Meeker County, Minnesota
 Ellsworth Township, Antelope County, Nebraska
 Ellsworth Township, Mahoning County, Ohio

See also

Ellsworth (disambiguation)

Township name disambiguation pages